The Monster Roars is the 22nd studio album by English rock band Magnum, released on 14 January 2022.

The first single, "I Won't Let You Down", was released on 12 November 2021, followed by a second, "No Steppin' Stones", on 17 December 2021. A long-postponed European tour is set to follow the release.

Track listing

Personnel
Tony Clarkin – guitar
Bob Catley – vocals
Dennis Ward – bass guitar
Rick Benton – keyboards
Lee Morris – drums

Charts

References

2022 albums
Magnum (band) albums